The Swilcan Bridge, or Swilken Bridge, or Swilcanth as it was known, is a small stone bridge in St Andrews Links golf course, Scotland. The bridge spans the Swilcan Burn between the first and eighteenth fairways on the Old Course, and has become an important image in the sport of golf. The bridge had previously been known as the Golfers' Bridge for hundreds of years. 

The bridge itself is small; at its farthest extent it measures about 30 feet long, eight feet wide and six feet tall, in the style of a simple Roman arch. Originally built at least 700 years ago to help shepherds get livestock across, it has the modern photographic advantage of great backdrops on three sides: the course's grand Royal and Ancient Clubhouse and Hamilton Grand on one, often a packed grandstand of enthusiasts on another, and rolling hills facing toward the North Sea, on the third.

The approach to the bridge was on turf, although there had been a stone path in the distant past. Due to the prominence of the bridge, many people often congregated near it—for example to see and photograph players standing on it, and to stand on the bridge when golf was not being played—which caused the turf to become badly eroded. This was addressed by frequent returfing or reseeding of the area, and experimenting with artificial turf, but the problem remained. In 2023 the area that saw most wear was paved with stone, as it had been in the distant past. This led to criticism that it looked like a "DIY patio".

It is customary for champions of golf to publicly show some sort of homage or respect to the structure. For example, in early July 2010 at The Open Championship Tom Watson was photographed kissing the bridge. At the 2005 Open Championship, Jack Nicklaus gave his final farewell to professional golf while standing on the bridge. 

On the second floor of the World Golf Hall of Fame museum in St. Augustine, Florida, there is a life-size stone replica of the Swilcan Bridge, accompanied by a floor-to-ceiling photograph of the Royal & Ancient clubhouse and Hamilton Hall in the background.

References

External links
 

Bridges in Fife
History of golf